Liolaemus fitzingerii,  Fitzinger's tree iguana,  is a species of lizard in the family  Liolaemidae. It is native to Chile and Argentina.

References

fitzingerii
Reptiles described in 1837
Reptiles of Chile
Reptiles of Argentina
Taxa named by André Marie Constant Duméril
Taxa named by Gabriel Bibron